A gyropalette is a piece of equipment used in the production of sparkling wine, such as Champagne, made by the traditional method, where the second fermentation takes place in the bottle.

Background 
In order to remove the yeast sediment ("lees") left in the bottle after the fermentation, riddling (or in French remuage) is performed. At certain intervals, the bottle is twisted, shaken slightly and moved progressively to a vertical position with the neck pointing down. Traditionally, this used to take place manually over the course of several weeks, with wine cellar workers called remueurs performing the task on each individual bottle.

A gyropalette performs the same task automatically on many bottles at the same time, and in a shorter period of time. The bottles are placed in a cage, and are moved in a way which emulates the action of a remueur by means of motors and automatic controls.

The gyropalette was invented by two French vintners, Claude Cazals and Jacques Ducion, who filed for patent in 1968. It was first introduced in Spain in the mid-1970s with Cava-producer Codorníu as the first big user. Most sparkling wines produced by the traditional method, including most Champagne, is now produced using gyropalettes. The manual method is still used for some high-end wines.

See also 
 Sparkling wine production

References 

Sparkling wines
Oenology
Champagne (wine)